What Wild Ecstasy: The Rise and Fall of the Sexual Revolution is a 1997 book about the sexual revolution by John Heidenry. The book received mixed reviews. It was described as interesting and Heidenry was complimented for his discussions of figures such as Bob Guccione, Hugh Hefner, Larry Flynt, and Reuben Sturman. However, he was criticized for his research methods. He was accused of plagiarism because of the use he made of material by other writers, receiving criticism in particular from the journalist Philip Nobile. Critics also wrote that he focused disproportionately on pornography and gave insufficient attention to feminism and women's issues.

Summary

Heidenry discusses the sexual revolution. He writes that his aim is to "provide an entertaining, informative, and perhaps occasionally even shocking popular historical overview of all that has happened in the wide world of human sexuality in the last thirty or so years, with particular emphasis on its epicenter, the United States." He discusses figures including the biologist Alfred Kinsey, the gynecologist William Masters, the pornographer Reuben Sturman, the sexologist Virginia E. Johnson, the publisher Hugh Hefner, the photographer Bob Guccione, the writer Marco Vassi, the journalist Philip Nobile, and the publisher Larry Flynt, and subjects such as pornography, feminism, and homosexuality. He discusses pornographic magazines such as Penthouse Forum, Penthouse, Hustler, and Screw.

Other topics discussed include swinging.

Publication history
What Wild Ecstasy was first published by Simon & Schuster in 1997. Later that year, it was published by William Heinemann Australia.

Reception
What Wild Ecstasy received positive reviews from Barbara M. Bibel in Library Journal and Alex Abramovich in Entertainment Weekly, and mixed reviews from Genevieve Stuttaford in Publishers Weekly, the journalist Robert Christgau in The New York Times Book Review, Sharon Ullman in The Journal of American History, and the critic Roz Kaveney in New Statesman. The book was also reviewed by Donna Seaman in Booklist, the political commentator Mark Steyn in The Wall Street Journal, the critic Liesl Schillinger in The Washington Post, the journalist Will Hermes in Utne Reader, and the political scientist Jean Bethke Elshtain in The Times Literary Supplement, and discussed by Janny Scott in The New York Times, Jeff Garigliano in Folio, and the journalist Scott Stossel in The American Prospect.

Bibel considered the book interesting, well-written, and entertaining. She credited Heidenry with trying to provide a balanced account of the sexual revolution that presented the views of both its supporters and opponents, and with providing an "extensive list of sources." Abramobich described the book as interesting and credited Heidenry with showing that, "sex, just like everything else human, is a muddle--both tonic and poison, self-fulfilling and self-destructive, transcendent and mundane, stunning and boring." Stuttaford described the book a "breezy popular history" that was, "Exhausting, colorful, by turns tedious and entertaining". She wrote that Heidenry "disconcertingly gives equal weight to magazine pornography, swingers' clubs, flesh films and sexual minorities, as if all these pheonmena were part of a great sexual awakening", but concluded that What Wild Ecstasy was an "informative survey nonetheless, filled with revealing intimate profiles" and "notable for its strong opposition to homophobia and its fair-minded analysis of gay and lesbian issues."

Christgau criticized Heidenry for relying on secondary research, writing that he was often "content to collate the reporting of others." He commented that an important aspect of Heidenry's method was that it affirmed the value of journals such as Forum, Penthouse, Hustler, and Screw, writing that without his attention to them, "this material might have been lost to history." He noted that there had been complaints from writers whose work Heidenry relied on, but believed that "he adds something to what he appropriates." He also wrote that, "There is a warmth to his book that is rarely apparent in the sex magazines". Ullman believed that Heidenry made good use of his background as a magazine editor and wrote with "verve". She credited him with providing extensive material on Kinsey, Masters, Johnson, Guccione, Hefner, Flynt, Sturman, and Vassi. However, she criticized the "rather simplistic narrative thread" of the book, describing it as a "mess". She wrote that, "Heidenry is difficult to follow as people appear, events suddenly happen, and few connections are drawn." She maintained that his real interest was pornography, and that he neglected other topics; she described his chapter on homosexuality as "a dry twenty-page civil rights discussion", and also accused him of giving insufficient attention to women.

Kaveney credited Heidenry with providing useful discussions of the careers of Guccione, Hefner, and Sturman and praised his "good index and thorough notation of sources." However, she criticized him for focusing almost exclusively on the United States, for relying on "urban legends and the self-promoting inflations of prosecutors and propagandists" in his estimates of the profits of the pornography industry, for failing to fully discuss scandals involving right-wing organizations, and for ignoring the "sex wars" within feminism. She described his account of the sexual revolution as "handy if over-simplified chronology", but wrote that, "The analysis is simplistic - all liberation leads to human liberation, the road to excess to the palace of wisdom and so on." Garigliano reported on accusations against Heidenry made by Nobile, who claimed that Heidenry had used passages from Forum and Penthouse in What Wild Ecstasy, as well as Heidenry's response to the accusations.

Scott wrote that Heidenry had been accused of plagiarism by numerous authors, who wrote to Simon & Schuster to complain that he had taken "dozens of phrases, descriptions and ideas" from their work. She questioned whether Heidenry was actually guilty of plagiarism. She suggested that the portions of his writing that were similar to those of other writers were insufficiently unique to constitute plagiarism. According to Scott, while Nobile wanted Simon & Schuster to recall What Wild Ecstasy, it declined to do so, arguing that the parallels consisted only of "purely factual" statements "available for all writers to use", although it did offer "to change future printings, crediting four articles Mr. Heidenry left out of his sources list." She also wrote that, "Heidenry said he decided to keep his source notes succinct because he was writing not for scholars but for the general public".

References

Bibliography
Books

 

Journals

  
  
  
  
  
  
  
  
  
  
  
  
  

Online articles

 

1997 non-fiction books
American non-fiction books
Books by John Heidenry
English-language books
Literature related to the sexual revolution